Kirby Corporation, headquartered in Houston, Texas is the largest tank barge operator in the United States, transporting bulk liquid products throughout the Mississippi River System, on the Gulf Intracoastal Waterway, along all three U.S. Coasts, and in Alaska and Hawaii. Products transported by Kirby include petrochemicals, black oil, refined petroleum products and agricultural chemical products by tank barge. Kirby also owns and operates eight ocean-going barge and tug units transporting dry-bulk commodities in United States coastwise trade.

Through Kirby's diesel engine services segment, Kirby is an after-market service provider for medium-speed and high-speed diesel engines, reduction gears and ancillary products for marine and power generation applications. Kirby also serves as a distributor and service provider for high-speed diesel engines, transmissions, pumps and compression products, and manufactures and remanufactures oilfield service equipment, including pressure pumping units, for the land-based pressure pumping and oilfield service markets.

Kirby Inland Marine operates the nation's largest fleet of inland tank barges and towing vessels.

Kirby's service area spans America's inland waterway network including The Gulf Intracoastal Waterway, the Mississippi River System, the Illinois River, the Ohio River and other waterways. Kirby operates 884 active inland tank barges, 251 active towing vessels and five fleets.

History
The predecessor of the current company, Kirby Industries, Inc., was founded in 1921. The current company was founded in 1969 as a subsidiary of that company called Kirby Exploration Company, Inc., and later spun off in 1976. The company changed its name in 1990.

Management

Board of Directors: 
Anne-Marie N. Ainsworth
Richard J. Alario
C. Sean Day
Tanya S. Beder
Barry E. Davis
David W. Grzebinski, President and CEO
Monte J. Miller
Joseph H. Pyne, Chairman
Richard R. Stewart
William M. Waterman

Corporate Officers: 

 David W. Grzebinski - President and chief executive officer
 William G. Harvey - Executive Vice President and Chief Financial Officer
 Christian G. O’Neil - President – Kirby Inland Marine, LP and Kirby Offshore Marine, LLC
 Joseph H. Reniers - President – Kirby Distribution & Services, Inc.
 Kim B. Clarke - Vice President and Chief Human Resource Officer
 Ronald A. Dragg - Vice President, Controller and Assistant Secretary
 Eric S. Holcomb - Vice President – Investor Relations
 Amy D. Husted - Vice President, General Counsel and Secretary
 Scott P. Miller - Vice President and Chief Information Officer
 Kurt A. Niemietz - Vice President and Treasurer
 William Matthew Woodruff - Vice President – Public and Governmental Affairs

Subsidiaries
The company has a number of subsidiaries:

Marine Transportation 
Kirby Offshore Marine, LLC
Kirby Ocean Transport Company
Osprey Line, LLC
San Jac Marine, LLC
Kirby Inland Marine, LP
Penn Maritime
Distribution and Services
United Holdings LLC
Stewart & Stevenson LLC
Stewart & Stevenson Power Products LLC
Stewart & Stevenson Manufacturing Technologies LLC
Stewart & Stevenson de las Americas Colombia, Ltda
Marine Systems, Inc
Engine Systems, Inc
United Engines, LLC
UE Manufacturing, LLC
Thermo King of Houston, LP
Thermo King of Dallas, LP
Other
Kirby Corporate Services, LLC
Kirby Terminals, Inc.
Kirby Logistics Management
Kirby Tankships, Inc.
KIM Holdings, Inc.
Sabine Transportation Company
AFRAM Carriers, Inc.
K Equipment, LLC

References

External links

Companies in the Dow Jones Transportation Average
Companies listed on the New York Stock Exchange
Companies based in Houston
Transport companies established in 1969
1969 establishments in Texas
Shipping companies of the United States